Leskiopsis is a genus of bristle flies in the family Tachinidae. There are at least two described species in Leskiopsis.

Species
These two species belong to the genus Leskiopsis:
 Leskiopsis brasiliensis Townsend, 1929
 Leskiopsis thecata (Coquillett, 1895)

References

Further reading

External links

 
 

Dexiinae